Schoolhouse No. 5 is a historic building in Hamden, New York. This one-room schoolhouse was built in the winter of 1857–1858, and was then known as Upper Dunk Hill School. The school was in use from 1858 to 1954. It is located at 5942 Dunk Hill Road and was officially recognized as a historic place in 2011.

References

Defunct schools in New York (state)
Former school buildings in the United States
National Register of Historic Places in Delaware County, New York
School buildings completed in 1858